= The Noble Student and His Cinderella =

Japanese manga series

- First tankōbon volume cover

大正學生愛妻家 (Taishō Gakusei Aisai-ka)
- Genre: Historical, romance
- Manga
- Written by: Suzu Kayukawa
- Published by: Kodansha
- English publisher: Kodansha
- Imprint: Morning KC
- Magazine: Morning Two
- Original run: June 6, 2024 – present
- Volumes: 6

The Noble Student and His Cinderella (Japanese: 大正學生愛妻家, Hepburn: Taishō Gakusei Aisai-ka) is a Japanese manga series written and illustrated by Suzu Kayukawa. It began serialization on Kodansha's Morning Two manga website in June 2024.

== Synopsis ==
The series is set in Tokyo in the tenth year of the Taishō period (1921). It is centered around the relationship between Fuki, a 24-year-old maid who works for the Tachibana family, and Yugo, the 19-year-old heir of the Tachibana family.

== Characters ==
Fuki Tachibana (立花ふき, Tachibana Fuki)/née Kobayashi (小林)
Fuki was born into an impoverished family and in her early childhood she was often teased a lot by the other children in her town due to her parents being known as "vagabonds," but despite this she grew up in a loving home. However, that changed drastically after the death of her mother; with her grief-stricken father no longer able to take care of her, on the recommendation of her teacher, she went to Tokyo to work for an affluent family as a housemaid. Despite all that had happened to her in her hometown she remained kind, lively, and hardworking.
Yugo Tachibana (立花有吾, Tachibana Yūgo)
Yugo was born to the affluent Tachibana family. Fuki, who worked in his family's manor, became fond of her as they were often playmates. He later moved in with his uncle in Hokkaido at age twelve for middle school and returned to his family at age eighteen to study at the First Imperial University. Upon his return he was reunited with Fuki. With Yugo's good looks, great academic performance, and calm and collected personality, he was a highly sought-after son-in-law even after his marriage to Fuki.

== Publication ==
Written and illustrated by Suzu Kayukawa, The Noble Student and His Cinderella began serialization on Kodansha's Morning Two manga website on June 6, 2024. Its chapters have been compiled into six tankōbon volumes as of November 2026.

The series' chapters are simultaneously published in English on Kodansha's K Manga app.

No.	Release date	ISBN
1	November 21, 2024	978-4-06-537458-0
2	April 23, 2025	978-4-06-539034-4
3	September 22, 2025	978-4-06-540701-1; 978-4-06-541275-6 (SE)
4	January 22, 2026	978-4-06-542060-7; 978-4-06-542248-9 (SE)
5	June 23, 2026	978-4-06-543700-1; 978-4-06-543699-8 (SE)
6	November 20, 2026	978-4-06-545303-2

== Reception ==
By December 2025, the series had over 600,000 copies in circulation. By June 2026, the series had over a million copies in circulation.

The series was ranked seventh in the Nationwide Bookstore Employees' Recommended Comics list of 2026. The series was nominated for the 2026 EbookJapan Manga Awards. The series was nominated for the twelfth Next Manga Award in 2026 in the web category.
